James Wong (born April 20, 1959) is a Hong Kong-born American television producer, writer, and retired film director. Wong is best known for co-writing episodes of the Fox science fiction supernatural drama series The X-Files with his partner, Glen Morgan. Morgan and Wong are founders of  the Hard Eight Pictures and co-created Space: Above and Beyond. Wong also directed the films Final Destination, The One, and Dragonball Evolution.

Early life and education
Wong was born in Hong Kong. At age ten, he moved to the United States along with his family, settling in San Diego, California. During his youth, he met his future writing partner Glen Morgan at El Cajon Valley High School. Later on, he went to Loyola Marymount University, joining a comedy improvisational group. Originally seeking a major in engineering, he later switched to a film major after seeing Apocalypse Now at the Cinerama Dome. After graduating, he landed a job as an assistant to Sandy Howard. During this time, both Wong and Morgan wrote screenplays, eventually having one produced.

Personal life
James Wong is married to Teena Wong, and they have three children.

Career
With Morgan, he co-wrote The Boys Next Door. After this Wong became a story editor on the short-lived ABC crime drama Knightwatch. Later, with Morgan, Wong would work on many Stephen J. Cannell productions, including Wiseguy (as supervising producer), The Commish (as supervising producer), and as a staff writer and story editor for 21 Jump Street and its spinoff, Booker.

Wong and Morgan began working with Chris Carter in 1993 on the science fiction/drama The X-Files, about two FBI agents investigating the paranormal, filmed in Vancouver.

In 1995, Wong and Morgan were offered an $8 million, four-year contract deal with 20th Century Fox Television to write and produce television series. As part of this deal, Morgan and Wong went on to create the short-lived series Space: Above and Beyond.

They returned to The X-Files briefly in its fourth season (1996–1997) when they wrote the horror episode Home. Wong also made his television directing debut with the conspiracy-themed "Musings of a Cigarette Smoking Man", written by Morgan. Wong and Morgan also took on production and writing duties for Carter's Millennium. Later, they would go on to executive produce the short-lived NBC paranormal series The Others.

During 1995, both Wong and Morgan were hired by producer Joel Silver to write the third intended Tales from the Crypt movie called Body Count. Their script was loved by executive producers Silver, Richard Donner, Walter Hill, David Giler and Robert Zemeckis but the main producers Gilbert Adler and A L Katz hated it and Universal thought it would be too expensive to shoot.

In 2000, Wong directed Final Destination, which was originally conceived as an X-Files episode by writer Jeffrey Reddick and was then reworked by Wong and Morgan. Wong followed the directorial debut with The One (2001), an action film starring Jet Li, and with more horror films, including Willard (2003), directed by Glen Morgan and starring Crispin Glover, and a second sequel, Final Destination 3 (2006), directed by Wong. In late 2006, Wong and Morgan's remake of Black Christmas was released; the script was by Wong and Morgan and the film was directed by Morgan.

In 2009, Wong directed the live-action movie adaptation of the anime and manga media franchise Dragon Ball. It was poorly received by both critics and audiences.

Since 2011, Wong has been working with Ryan Murphy as an executive producer on American Horror Story.

In 2015, Wong wrote and directed one episode, Founder's Mutation, for the tenth season of The X-Files. He returned again in 2017 for The X-Files season eleven to write and direct the episode Ghouli, and to direct the episode Nothing Lasts Forever.

The X-Files 
As part of the initial production crew on The X-Files, Wong was among the most influential four writer-producers who worked closely with X-Files creator Chris Carter to define the characters, plots and aesthetics of the new series (the others were Glen Morgan, Howard Gordon and Alex Gansa). Wong was responsible with his longtime writing partner Glen Morgan for introducing a number of elements that defined The X-Files throughout its run.

Notable episodes co-written by Wong:

 "Squeeze", only the second X-Files episode ever produced, and the first "monster of the week" episode, which would provide a template for two thirds of the future episodes of the series.
 "Ice", the first episode to focus centrally on the Mulder/Scully relationship as the key to its plot.
 "Beyond the Sea", the first episode to receive notable critical acclaim beyond the science fiction genre, the first episode with serious character development for Gillian Anderson in her role as Dana Scully, and also Carter's personal favorite episode of the series.
 "E.B.E.", the first episode to introduce The Lone Gunmen trio of characters, whose popularity resulted in their own short-lived spinoff series (without Wong's participation) in 2001.
 "Tooms", the first episode to introduce the character of Walter Skinner, Mulder and Scully's boss, who would become a more central character over the remainder of the series, and also the first episode to give a speaking part to the Cigarette Smoking Man, the main nemesis of Mulder and Scully for most of the series' run.
 "Little Green Men", the first mythology episode to make use of voiceover and flashback.
 "Blood", the first episode to include a story contribution from Glen Morgan's brother Darin Morgan, who would become the most acclaimed X-Files writer and the only one to win an Emmy for his writing.
 "3", the first episode in which Mulder or Scully was involved in a sexual situation.
 "One Breath", the resolution episode for the abduction plot that was the foundation of the series' long running mythology.
 "Die Hand Die Verletzt", the first episode in which Kim Manners, who became the series' most prolific director over its nine seasons, was brought on board to direct, being an acquaintance of Morgan and Wong from their work with Manners on previous TV series.
 "Home", the first episode to be preceded by a warning from the network that it was intended for mature audiences only due to its disturbing content.

In his directorial debut, Wong also directed the episode "Musings of a Cigarette Smoking Man", for which he received an Emmy nomination, also becoming the first member of the series's regular writing staff (after Chris Carter) to direct an episode, as well as the only person of color to ever direct an X-Files episode. Wong's Emmy nomination for directing "Musings" made him the first Asian American to receive an Emmy nomination for directing anything on television; at that time, no Asian American and no person of Chinese descent had yet been nominated for an Oscar for directing a film. Wong was also, along with Chris Carter (nominated a year later) the only director of an X-Files episode to be Emmy nominated for his work.

As part of The X-Files main production team in 1994–1995, Wong shared the show's first Golden Globe Award win for Best Dramatic Series, and also shared its second win in the 1996–1997 season. (The X-Files would go on to become the first series to win a Golden Globe three times.) Wong was honoured as his name was used as character in The X-Files game released on the PS1 in 1998.

Filmography

Film

Television
 Booker (writer, story writer) (1989–1990)
 21 Jump Street (writer, story editor) (1989–1990)
 Wiseguy (supervising producer) (1990)
 The 100 Lives of Black Jack Savage (producer) (1991)
 The Commish (writer, supervising producer) (1991–1993)
 The X-Files (director, writer, co-executive producer, consulting producer) (1993–1997)
 Space: Above and Beyond (co-creator, writer) (1995–1996)
 Millennium (executive producer, consulting producer, writer) (1996–1998)
 The Others (executive producer, writer) (2000)
 Tower Prep (director – Episode: "Whisper") (2010)
 THE EVƎNT (director – Episode: "Arrival"; writer, co-executive producer) (2010–2011)
 American Horror Story (writer, co-executive producer) (2011–2019)
 Rosemary's Baby (Writer) (2014)
 The X-Files (director, writer) (2016–2018)
 9-1-1 (director) (2022)

References

External links
 
 James Wong Director Bio – Biography by Tribute

1959 births
Film producers from California
American television directors
Television producers from California
American television writers
American male screenwriters
American writers of Chinese descent
Film directors from California
Hong Kong emigrants to the United States
Horror film directors
Living people
Writers from San Diego
American male television writers
Screenwriters from California